Sergey Sevostianov, (Russian: Сергей Севостьянов), sometimes Sergei Sevastianov, is a blind Paralympian track and field athlete from Russia competing in pentathlon and jumping events

Career 
Sergei first competed for the Soviet Union in the 1988 Summer Paralympics in the pentathlon, 100m and triple jump winning a silver medal in all three.  At his second games, competing for the Unified Team, in 1992 Summer Paralympics he won gold in the pentathlon setting a new world record, he also finished joint first with Spain's Julio Requena, he also won silver in the triple jump and finished fifth in the long jump.

He competed in the 1996 Summer Paralympics in Atlanta, United States.  There, he won a gold medal in the men's Pentathlon - P10 event, a silver medal in the men's Long jump - F10 event, and went out in the first round of the men's 100 metres - T10 event.  He also competed at the 2000 Summer Paralympics in Sydney, Australia. There, he won a gold medal in the men's Pentathlon - P11 event, finished tenth in the men's Long jump - F11 event, and finished fourth in the men's Triple jump - F11 event.  He also competed at the 2004 Summer Paralympics in Athens, Greece. There, he won a bronze medal in the men's Long jump - F11 event and a bronze medal in the men's Triple jump - F11 event.

He holds the pentathlon world record for P11 classified athletes, set at the Sydney Paralympics. He set pentathlon world records at 3 consecutive paralympic games: 1992, 1996 and 2000.

References

External links 
 

Year of birth missing (living people)
Living people
Soviet male sprinters
Soviet male long jumpers
Soviet male triple jumpers
Soviet pentathletes
Russian pentathletes
Paralympic athletes of Russia
Paralympic gold medalists for Russia
Paralympic silver medalists for Russia
Paralympic bronze medalists for Russia
Paralympic gold medalists for the Unified Team
Paralympic silver medalists for the Unified Team
Paralympic medalists in athletics (track and field)
Athletes (track and field) at the 1988 Summer Paralympics
Athletes (track and field) at the 1992 Summer Paralympics
Athletes (track and field) at the 1996 Summer Paralympics
Athletes (track and field) at the 2000 Summer Paralympics
Athletes (track and field) at the 2004 Summer Paralympics
Medalists at the 1988 Summer Paralympics
Medalists at the 1992 Summer Paralympics
Medalists at the 1996 Summer Paralympics
Medalists at the 2000 Summer Paralympics
Medalists at the 2004 Summer Paralympics
World record holders in Paralympic athletics
Visually impaired sprinters
Visually impaired long jumpers
Visually impaired triple jumpers
Paralympic sprinters
Paralympic long jumpers
Paralympic triple jumpers